Cry! – Tender is an album by multi-instrumentalist Yusef Lateef recorded in 1959 (with one track recorded in 1957) and released on the New Jazz label.

Reception

The AllMusic site stated: "Lateef was already moving away from what most people would call jazz by this time, yet, as evidenced here, his music remained challenging and very accessible. This is meditative music with a stunningly rich rhythmic palette for how muted and edgeless it is. And, like John Cage or Morton Feldman, the absence of those edges was written in; it's not random".

Track listing
All compositions by Yusef Lateef, except where noted.
 "Seabreeze" (Larry Douglas, Fred Norman, Rommie Bearden) – 3:11
 "Dopolous" – 3:18
 "Cry! – Tender" – 6:00
 "Butter's Blues" – 5:45
 "Yesterdays" (Otto Harbach, Jerome Kern) – 4:24
 "The Snow Is Green" – 3:13
 "If You Could See Me Now" (Tadd Dameron, Carl Sigman) – 4:49
 "Ecaps" – 6:30
Recorded at Van Gelder Studio in Englewood Cliffs, New Jersey on October 16, 1959 except for track 8 recorded at Van Gelder Studio in Hackensack, New Jersey on October 11, 1957

Personnel
Yusef Lateef – tenor saxophone, flute (track 2), oboe (tracks 1,3 and 5)
Lonnie Hillyer – trumpet (tracks 2-7)
Wilbur Harden – flugelhorn (track 8)
Hugh Lawson – piano (tracks 1-7)
Ernie Farrow (track 8), Herman Wright (tracks 1-7) – bass
Frank Gant (tracks 1-7), Oliver Jackson (track 8) – drums, percussion

References

Yusef Lateef albums
1960 albums
Albums produced by Esmond Edwards
Albums recorded at Van Gelder Studio
New Jazz Records albums